may refer to:
 Akaishi Mountains or Minami-Alps, Japan
 Minami-Alps, Yamanashi, a city in Yamanashi Prefecture, Japan
 Minami Alps National Park, in the Akaishi Mountains, Honshū, Japan

See also
 Japanese Alps
 Southern Alps (disambiguation)